The Videocon Tri-Series was a three-team One Day International cricket tournament taking place in Zimbabwe between the hosts Zimbabwe, India and New Zealand. It started on 24 August 2005 and ended with the final on 6 September 2005, which New Zealand won by six wickets. Zimbabwe ended the tournament without a victory against a team other than rock-bottom Bangladesh for 35 ODI matches, since November 2003. Their last series win against a team other than Bangladesh or Kenya was, intriguingly, against New Zealand, in the 2000–01 season. India are still without a tournament win since March 2004, coming off an 18-run defeat by Sri Lanka in the final of the 2005 Indian Oil Cup, while New Zealand were comprehensively defeated 5–0 by Australia at home in their last series before this tournament. Before that, however, they were undefeated in six tournaments. The Supersub rule, which means that a player can be substituted for another at any time, but once the player is off he can not return, was introduced for this tournament. The stand-out performances came from Indian Mohammad Kaif, who hit 277 runs and was made Man of the Series, but Yuvraj Singh, and New Zealanders Stephen Fleming and Lou Vincent also passed 200 runs. On the bowling side, Shane Bond took 11 wickets at an average of just 8.63, despite being rested for one match, and Indian seamers Irfan Pathan and Ajit Agarkar also got more than 10 wickets.

Tournament structure 

The sides played each other in a double round robin, meaning that each side played four matches, for a total of six matches. A win was worth five points, and a loss zero – however, if the winning team had a run rate (i.e. runs hit per over) higher than 1.25 times that of the opponent, a bonus point was awarded to the winning side, if not it went to the losing side. In the event of a tie or a no-result, each side was to be awarded three points. The top two teams on points went through to the one-match final.

Schedule

Match details

1st ODI, Zimbabwe v New Zealand 24 August 

Lou Vincent and his New Zealand flayed a substandard Zimbabwe to all corners as they routed their way to the third highest score of all time in One Day International cricket. Despite the match being shortened to 44 overs a side following the discovery of a damp patch on the Bulawayo pitch, New Zealand hit runs right from the outset, and Zimbabwe did not take a wicket until the 28th over. By then, Vincent and Stephen Fleming had taken the score to 207 – already a fearsome total, and then you consider that 16 overs remained. No Zimbabwean bowler escaped the carnage, and it says something that debutant Anthony Ireland recorded the best bowling figures – still conceding 52 runs in his seven overs. Andy Blignaut, regarded as one of Zimbabwe's best bowlers, was dispatched for 96 runs – nine runs off the most expensive of all time. When the dust had settled, New Zealand had made 397 for 5 – one run short of Sri Lanka's nine-year-old record, which was set in 50 overs, and Brendon McCullum had equalled the fastest fifty for New Zealand, off 21 balls.

Zimbabwe, naturally, could not answer this, and they were up against a much stronger bowling attack than their own. The openers Brendan Taylor and Stuart Carlisle survived 14 overs, scoring 62 runs, but Chris Cairns and Andre Adams inspired a collapse to 123 for 6. At one point, Zimbabwe threatened to break the record of highest ODI defeat ever (256 runs), but 45 from Heath Streak, including two sixes, took them past 200. Overall, 205 all out wasn't such a bad score. The problem was that they had been so utterly demolished in the first innings – and two days later, they were to meet India's feared batting line-up, including people like Sourav Ganguly, Rahul Dravid and Virender Sehwag.
Cricinfo scorecard

2nd ODI, New Zealand v India, 26 August 

This was Shane Bond's first match against a team other than Zimbabwe since his return from injury, and Bond returned in style to inspire yet another ODI defeat for India. It was a match of two batting collapses, however, as Indian pacemen Irfan Pathan and Ashish Nehra used the conditions well to take five wickets in New Zealand first 13 overs. Lou Vincent, Stephen Fleming, Nathan Astle and Hamish Marshall all fell for single-figure scores, and with Jacob Oram and Craig McMillan coming in to bat, the score was 36 for 5.

However, the two batted responsibly together, even finding the time to hit a few sixes – most of them off Harbhajan Singh, who was carted for 55 runs in nine overs. In sixteen overs, the pair added 91 runs, and put New Zealand back on track. There were good scores from Chris Cairns, Brendon McCullum and Daniel Vettori too, and New Zealand put the new super sub rule to its full use and placed all-rounder Andre Adams at number 11 in the batting order. They finished on 215 all out, McCullum holing out with a straight hit that fell short of the boundary into Rahul Dravid's waiting hands, but his 49 turned out to be very crucial.

Then it was Shane Bond's turn. He did not need to bat because of the substitute rule, and he came on for Nathan Astle at the start of India's innings. Taking the new ball, he immediately menaced the Indian captain Sourav Ganguly with short balls. Somehow, Ganguly survived the first over, but he was shaken and fell to Bond's eighth delivery of the day – caught by the wicket-keeper McCullum for 5. The next ball was faced by Venugopal Rao – an inswinging yorker that bamboozled the new batsman and slammed into his stumps, out bowled. And Bond just continued the slaughter. After he had bowled one ball of his sixth over, he stood with five wickets to his name, having added Virender Sehwag, Rahul Dravid and Mohammad Kaif to his tally. Andre Adams also took three wickets as India crashed to 44 for 8.

For a while, India looked to threaten their worst all out score in ODI cricket of 54 against Sri Lanka, but Bond and Adams were taken off and the other bowlers just couldn't threaten. A well-paced partnership between Yadav and Pathan in fact threatened to turn the match around, but Bond came back, breaking up the partnership with a typical fast bowler's ball outside off stump to Pathan, who edged to McCullum behind the stumps. Four balls earlier, Bond had dropped Pathan off his own bowling. With the end of the partnership – worth 118 runs, eight off the Indian record – that broke Yadav's resistance, and he was out attempting a lofted drive over Craig McMillan, who could hold a simple catch to end the game.
Cricinfo scorecard

3rd ODI, Zimbabwe v India, 29 August 

Zimbabwe crawled to their fourth loss of over 100 runs in the last five matches, as they were bowled out for their third-lowest all out score in ODIs by a rampant Irfan Pathan. It followed a promising bowling effort, as India had been restricted to 121 for 4 after 35 overs – Mohammad Kaif tied down, as he could only make 65 despite having faced 122 balls. Earlier, Heath Streak had dismissed Venugopal Rao caught behind for a three-ball duck.

The dismissal of Kaif, however, brought a sense of haste to the Indian side. Dhoni slashed sixes off the youngsters Prosper Utseya and Ireland, needing only 39 balls to reach his fifty, which he did with a straight hit off Blignaut over the boundary fence for six. Trying to make another one in the very last over, he mistimed it slightly, and Blessing Mahwire could hold the catch. Ireland got another wicket, that of Ajit Agarkar, and so ended with figures of three for 54 – despite seven wides.

The Zimbabwean batting effort, however, was spineless. In the match against New Zealand earlier on in the week, they had at least managed 205, but this time they could only bat respectably for seven overs. In the eighth over, Ajit Agarkar dismissed Vusi Sibanda and Hamilton Masakadza, and that started the collapse. In 10.4 overs, Zimbabwe could only muster 26 runs, and lost a total of eight wickets to crash to 43 for 9. By that time, no batsman had made it into double figures. Heath Streak and Prosper Utseya battled out for seven more overs, before Utseya was finally caught by Rahul Dravid for 11, leaving Zimbabwe all out for 65. Extras made up 13.8% of the total score, and was the third-highest scorer, thanks to all the wides bowled by Pathan, Nehra and Ajit Agarkar. Nevertheless, India had recorded a thumping victory, their highest by runs in two and a half years, but were still criticised by Cricinfo for not showing much improvement. (Cricinfo scorecard)

4th ODI, Zimbabwe v New Zealand, 31 August 

Zimbabwe suffered their third loss of the series, and although the margin of defeat was smaller, the way in which it was achieved suggested that Zimbabwean coach Kevin Curran still had a lot to work on. Admittedly, it started very well, as Streak got Vincent out with the third delivery of the match. Ireland continued his happy knack of getting wickets, getting the opposing skipper Stephen Fleming for 23 and Hamish Marshall for 7, as New Zealand struggled to 67 for 4.

However, Scott Styris and Astle fought back well. Styris made 63, relying on nurdling the singles into the leg side, as he only hit ten runs in boundaries. However, he held the innings together twice. The first time was in his 62-run partnership with Astle. Then, when both Oram and McCullum deserted him within six overs and the scoreboard showed 149 for 7, he remained calm. His partnership with Vettori carried New Zealand past 200, Vettori joining Styris in nurdling the ball – his 47 runs included only 12 in boundaries. Andy Blignaut then got three wickets with five balls as New Zealand were bowled out for 238.

However, Bond and Kyle Mills tied down the Zimbabwean batting effectively. After eight overs, Brendan Taylor and debutant Justice Chibhabha had both been caught by wicket-keeper McCullum, and the score was eight for 2. Sibanda played himself in, however, and looked to go on when he attempted a difficult second run and was run out for 21. The Zimbabwean batsmen just couldn't hit out at all, and by the end of the 35th over, they were 93 for 6 – having just seen Heath Streak out for 18, two balls after he had hit a thumping drive for six.

Needing 146 runs to win from 90 balls, Zimbabwe just went for the hit. Charles Coventry smashed two straight sixes, before top edging to the keeper for 35. Andy Blignaut also hit sixes, getting a 44-ball fifty, but the next two balls did not give any runs and he was caught at the boundary by Astle. The batsmen had crossed, so Blessing Mahwire – on 8 – faced the last ball of Bond's over, and duly mistimed a drive to Oram to complete the 27-run defeat. 
Cricinfo scorecard

5th ODI, New Zealand v India, 2 September 

New Zealand got plenty of practice in their last ODI of the group stage, but were found lacking after resting their best bowlers, Shane Bond and Daniel Vettori. Nehra and Pathan, India's opening bowlers, were taken for runs early on as they sought for wickets but the openers Fleming and Astle escaped, adding 44 in the first 10 overs before Fleming let himself loose with a couple of aerial shots on the off side to take ten off an over from Pathan. Agarkar, who had come on for Nehra earlier, then had Astle caught behind for 11, but Vincent and Fleming continued to punish the bowling, and by the end of 15 overs they were 81 for 1 – Nehra having conceded 35 in five overs. However, once again Agarkar was responsible for a breakthrough, running out Fleming with a good throw after having picked up the ball in his follow-through.

Another run out three overs later saw Vincent back in the pavilion, having added 37, before Hamish Marshall was bowled through the gate for 8 by Yadav, and all of a sudden New Zealand were 115 for 4, and patience was required from Styris and McMillan. They played that role well, only hitting 16 runs in boundaries between them yet adding 87 together, setting the stage for hard hitting from wicket-keeper McCullum. Styris, once again, was the highest scorer of the New Zealand innings. After playing himself in, McCullum first hit a six off Agarkar to end the 44th over, before unleashing himself in the 46th. He was caught off a no-ball and dropped off the next delivery, and then smashed the remaining five balls for eighteen, with three fours and one six. Having added 28 in total, he then was caught by Kaif, but the pace was set. New Zealand notched up 31 runs in the final three overs, not bothering much with the loss of wickets, and ended with 278 for 9.

However, India quickly showed their intent. As Andre Adams pitched it short outside the off stump, Virender Sehwag feasted, smashing sixteen off one over, and taking only 34 balls for his 45 before dragging a ball from Oram into his own stumps. With the other opener, Sourav Ganguly, having made 19, India had made a solid start, with 75 runs coming off 50 deliveries. Rahul Dravid and Mohammad Kaif came to the crease, and the pair slowed down the run rate somewhat, but still hit plenty of boundaries when opportunities arose, keeping the required rate around 5. New Zealand's bowlers tried to apply pressure, but only Scott Styris managed to do so with any consistency, bowling nine overs in a spell before his last over yielded 10 runs – which prompted Fleming to bring on spinner Jeetan Patel. Dhoni came on a few overs earlier as Yuvraj was out for 22, and the big-hitting wicket-keeper punished Patel with two straight sixes to bring the equation from 19 off 22 to 7 off 20. Dhoni then ended the match with six runs off the balls from Andre Adams, who conceded 67 runs in total, to see India into the final and make the last match with Zimbabwe academic.
Cricinfo scorecard

6th ODI, Zimbabwe v India, 4 September 

Zimbabwe lost this match in the first three and the last ten overs, fighting well for the other 85. They lost Sibanda and Masakadza in the third over to the left-arm seamer R. P. Singh, who celebrated his ODI debut with two wickets in his second over, and Ajit Agarkar tied down the other end with accurate outswing. However, Brendan Taylor and Tatenda Taibu fought back with boundaries through the third man and point regions, building a partnership of 46 for the third wicket before Yuvraj Singh was responsible for his third run out of the tournament, forcing down the stumps at the striker's end with a well-timed throw.

Zimbabwe, however, still had their captain Taibu in, and joined by the hard-hitting Coventry he set out to give Zimbabwe a competitive score. The pair batted responsibly, yet did not stay away from punishing the balls delivered on an errant length, and in 11 overs the pair added 60 runs as Zimbabwe moved to 110 for 3 at the halfway mark, with Taibu on 51. Sourav Ganguly even brought himself on to stop the Zimbabwean onslaught, but after delivering two no-balls and a wide and conceding 24 runs in four overs he wisely left bowling to the specialists. Yadav got smashed early on, but recovered well to bowl a maiden over and take the wicket of Taibu for 71. However, that brought the hard-hitting Blignaut to the crease, and he and Coventry attacked the bowlers with venom. Coventry had a particular love for Murali Kartik, whom he took for one six and one four in an over, before finally hitting one lofted straight shot too much, and Kartik could hold the catch – gone for 74, his first ODI fifty. The partnership of Coventry and Blignaut had added 61 from 49 deliveries.

The last five overs were not quite as productive, however, with Agarkar keeping the run rate down and taking wickets in the process, but Zimbabwe still set a target of 251. Sehwag and Ganguly opened for India, and Sehwag started in typical fashion, taking boundaries off both Mahwire and Ireland, but Mahwire got one onto his stumps as he was bowled for 12. Things quickly went from bad to worse for India, with skipper Ganguly edging to Vusi Sibanda for 2, before Rahul Dravid and Mohammad Kaif were dismissed in successive overs. India used their super sub, bringing on Venugopal Rao for R. P. Singh, and Venugopal and Yuvraj Singh took some early hits off Blignaut and Ireland to calm the jitters. Nevertheless, by the end of the 20 power play overs India were 82 for 4, needing 169 to win off the remaining 30 overs.

At the end of the powerplay overs, Taibu brought on his spinners Gavin Ewing and Prosper Utseya, and the two frustrated the Indian batsmen, only giving up eight runs in four overs. With the required run rate ballooning, India needed singles, and Keith Dabengwa could run out the non-striker Venugopal Rao with a direct hit as Rao attempted the single while Yuvraj stood his ground. Dhoni, coming in at seven, kept his head cool against the spinners in the remaining overs, though, as he was tied down by Sean Williams and Dabengwa. However, in the 39th over he unleashed himself, taking a six and a four off Sean Williams as he quickly moved to 42. Yuvraj also hit plenty of runs, as the Zimbabwean seamers were smashed around the ground, and his 120 eventually secured victory – even though he was caught by Dabengwa off Blignaut. It didn't matter. India needed six from the last three overs, but only hit one off the third to last, before Dhoni got to face Mahwire and promptly smashed the last ball for six to win the game for India.
(Cricinfo scorecard)

Final group stage table

Final, New Zealand v India, 6 September 

India lost the Final as they went down to New Zealand in Harare. And yet again, they threw away a very promising start. Batting first after Sourav Ganguly won the toss, the returning Shane Bond and Kyle Mills kept them down for the first two overs, bowling an accurate line as the score moved to five for no loss. Sehwag and Ganguly eventually found their feet, though, and after thirteen overs they had added 72 runs, despite being beaten time and again. Jacob Oram conceded fifteen runs off his first eleven deliveries, but Ganguly holed out as he was caught by Hamish Marshall. At 72 for 1, India were well in control, and Mohammad Kaif started to accumulate with Sehwag. Boundaries came with regularity, as India moved past 100 and then past 150 without losing a wicket. At 153 for 1 after 24 overs, they were genuinely looking at a chance to get 300.

Sehwag, however, was caught by Lou Vincent for 75, and that started a flurry of wickets for New Zealand. Rahul Dravid, who had had a poor series with only 64 runs in four innings, continued on that vein of form as he was deceived by a quick arm ball from Daniel Vettori for a two-ball 0 – Vettori's second wicket of the innings. Astle, Mills and Vettori tied down the batsmen, as no boundaries were given up in the next eight overs, and Yuvraj felt like he had to attack. He got away with a lofted shot through midwicket for four on the second ball of a Mills over, but shortly afterwards he had a feel at a short ball which landed in Shane Bond's hands – and Yuvraj was gone for a stifled 20. Kaif was still in, but he ran out of partners, as no one could help him keep the run rate up. Jacob Oram got three wickets to redeem his figures, ending with four for 58, although the latter three came in the last ten overs – one of them was Yadav, who gave a simple leading edge to the wicket-keeper McCullum, and the last was a straight drive from Pathan which fell short of the boundary and into Lou Vincent's hands. With Dhoni adjudged lbw to a ball that struck him in the stomach as well, India were all out for 276, Kaif left stranded on 93 not out after taking a single on the first ball of the over.

New Zealand's batting effort started quietly, with Irfan Pathan using the hint of swing to bowl a maiden to captain Fleming first up. But inaccurate line and length in the next five overs allowed New Zealand to plunder 62, Fleming hitting five fours from the 5th over, and the run rate raced along. By the end of 15 power play overs, New Zealand had made 112 for no loss, Fleming having made a 51-ball half-century while Astle was on 45. Ganguly turned to his spinners, banking on Virender Sehwag to give him a few tight overs, and he complied. The first over conceded four runs, and in his second he held a return catch as Fleming went for 61. Four balls later, Hamish Marshall was out for 3, and India were in with a small shout. However, well-timed innings from Scott Styris, who made 37, and Craig McMillan with 13, and the occasional awful over – JP Yadav's only contribution to the match was a 14-run over – left New Zealand with 72 in 12.3 overs with six wickets in hand. With Lou Vincent and Nathan Astle in good hitting form – they took 17 off a Harbhajan over as Astle brought up his 100 with his first six of the match – this was no problem, and Vincent won New Zealand the game by hitting Agarkar for four with 11 balls to spare.

References 
 Cricinfo page on the tri-series

Footnotes 

International cricket tours of Zimbabwe
2005 in Zimbabwean cricket
One Day International cricket competitions
2005 in cricket